Christopher Nugent was an Irish writer of the 16th century.

Christopher Nugent may also refer to:

Christopher Nugent (Medal of Honor) (1838–1898)
Christopher Nugent (physician) (1698–1775), Irish Fellow of the Royal Society
Christopher Nugent, Lord Delvin, Irish lord